Patriarch Sergius of Constantinople may refer to:

 Sergius II of Constantinople, Ecumenical Patriarch in 1001–1019
 Sergius I of Constantinople, Ecumenical Patriarch in 610–638